MacKenzie Bay is a relatively small embayment of the western extremity of the Amery Ice Shelf, Antarctica, about  northeast of Foley Promontory. On 10 February 1931 the British Australian New Zealand Antarctic Research Expedition (BANZARE) sighted a much larger embayment here and made an airplane flight to sketch its limits. They named it "MacKenzie Sea" after Captain K.N. MacKenzie, the master of the expedition's ship Discovery in 1930–31. Several Norwegian whaling ships sighted the original embayment nearly simultaneously with BANZARE; the whale-catcher Seksern (Captain Brunvoll) reached this area on 13 January 1931 and the Torlyn (Captain Klarius Mikkelsen) on 13 February 1931.

References

Bays of Mac. Robertson Land